Broken English is a 2007 American romantic comedy-drama film written and directed by Zoe Cassavetes, in her feature directorial debut. The film stars Parker Posey, Melvil Poupaud, Drea de Matteo, Justin Theroux, Peter Bogdanovich, and Gena Rowlands.

Broken English had its world premiere at the Sundance Film Festival on January 20, 2007 and a limited theatrical release in the United States on June 22, 2007. The film was nominated for two Independent Spirit Awards: Best Female Lead for Posey and Best First Screenplay for Cassavetes.

Plot
Nora Wilder (Parker Posey), a single career woman, works at a Manhattan boutique hotel where her excellent skills in guest relations are the complete opposite of her skills in the romance department. If it is not her loving yet dominant mother (Gena Rowlands) attempting to set her up that consistently fails, she has her friend's (Drea de Matteo) disastrous blind dates to rely on as a backup for further dismay. She's surrounded by friends who are all either happily engaged or romantically involved and somehow, love escapes Nora—until she meets an unusual Frenchman (Melvil Poupaud) who helps her discover life beyond her self-imposed boundaries.

Cast

 Parker Posey as Nora Wilder
 Melvil Poupaud as Julien
 Drea de Matteo as Audrey Andrews
 Justin Theroux as Nick Gable
 Peter Bogdanovich as Irving Mann
 Gena Rowlands as Vivien Wilder-Mann
 Roy Thinnes as Peter Andrews
 Tim Guinee as Mark Andrews
 Michael Panes as Glen
 Dana Ivey as Elinor Gregory
 William Wise as William Gregory
 Josh Hamilton as Charlie Ross
 Caitlin Keats as Jennifer Ross
 Michael Kelly as Guy
 James McCaffrey as Perry
 Phyllis Somerville as Psychic
 Bernadette Lafont as Madame Grenelle
 Thierry Hancisse as Mr. Larson

Release
The film screened at the 2007 Sundance Film Festival. It was also entered into the 29th Moscow International Film Festival.

Reception
Broken English received mixed reviews. Film review aggregator Rotten Tomatoes gives the film a 64% "fresh" rating, based on 73 reviews. Jason Clark of Slant Magazine gave the film 2.5 out of 4 stars, saying, "when the picture finally resolves with the exact same ending as Richard Linklater's Before Sunset (and I mean exactly—with even the same two last lines, for God's sake), you have to wonder if Ms. Cassavetes gets out as much as her lead character eventually does." Michael Phillips of the Chicago Tribune called it a "promising first film with moments exceeding that promise."

Awards and nominations

References

External links

 

2007 films
2007 directorial debut films
2007 independent films
2007 romantic comedy-drama films
American independent films
American romantic comedy-drama films
Films shot in New York City
Films shot in Paris
Magnolia Pictures films
2000s American films